Philtraea elegantaria is a species of geometrid moth in the family Geometridae. It is found in North America.

The MONA or Hodges number for Philtraea elegantaria is 6845.

Subspecies
These two subspecies belong to the species Philtraea elegantaria:
 Philtraea elegantaria elegantaria
 Philtraea elegantaria paucimacula Barnes & McDunnough

References

Further reading

 

Ourapterygini
Articles created by Qbugbot
Moths described in 1881